This is a list of films which have placed number one at the weekly box office in the United Kingdom during 1991.

Number one films

Highest-grossing films

Notes

See also 
 List of British films — British films by year
 Lists of box office number-one films

References

1991
United Kingdom
Box office number-one films